Neocoenyra kivuensis is a butterfly in the family Nymphalidae. It is found in the eastern part of the Democratic Republic of the Congo, Burundi, western Tanzania, Zambia and Malawi. The habitat consists of Brachystegia woodland, montane grassland on forest margins, at altitudes between 1,000 and 2,000 meters.

References

Satyrini
Butterflies described in 1929